RS Sagittarii is an eclipsing binary star system in the southern constellation of Sagittarius, abbreviated RS Sgr. It is a double-lined spectroscopic binary with an orbital period of 2.416 days, indicating that the components are too close to each other to be individually resolved. The system has a combined apparent visual magnitude of 6.01, which is bright enough to be faintly visible to the naked eye. During the primary eclipse the brightness drops to magnitude 6.97, while the secondary eclipse is of magnitude 6.28. The distance to this system is approximately 1,420 light years based on parallax measurements.

The variability of this system was initially suspected by B. A. Gould in 1879, then confirmed by A. W. Roberts in 1895. Roberts determined this to be an Algol-type variable with a period of 2.416 days. In his 1915 study of eclipsing binaries, H. Shapley listed a low orbital eccentricity of 0.091 for this binary system. He considered both eclipses to be partial, but only after correcting for limb darkening. R. S. Dugan and F. W. Wright in 1939 discovered evidence that suggested the period is varying.

R. L. Baglow in 1948 found an essentially circular orbit with a primary component of spectral class B5. By 1986, O. E. Ferrer and J. Sahade were able to extract spectral information about the secondary component, finding the system consists of ordinary main sequence stars of classes B5V and A2V. Hydrogen alpha emission lines suggested that the stars are interacting. The system appears to be semidetached, and may have already undergone a mass exchange phase.

The primary component of the system is the more massive of the pair, having 7.18 times the mass of the Sun compared to 2.41 times the Sun's mass for the secondary member. The primary is the larger star, with 5.11 times the Sun's radius while the secondary has 2.41 solar radii. The pair are separated by about 16 times the radius of the Sun. The primary is radiating 1,350 times the Sun's luminosity from its photosphere at an effective temperature of 15,480 K. The cooler secondary is 8,760 K and radiates 89.1 times the luminosity of the Sun.

RS Sgr shares a common proper motion with the 9th-magnitude stars TYC-7400-1102-1 and HD 167669,  and they would form a quadruple system.  Any orbits would take hundreds of thousands of years.  TYC-7400-1102-1 is an A1 main-sequence star with a mass around twice that of the Sun, while HD 167669 is a slightly brighter B9 main sequence star with a mass about three times the Sun's.  HD 167669 itself has a close optical companion, but it appears to be much more distant.  Together with RS Sgr, these stars have the Washington Double Star Catalog designation WDS J18176-3406.

References

B-type main-sequence stars
A-type main-sequence stars
Algol variables

Sagittarius (constellation)
6833
Durchmusterung objects
167647
89637
Sagittarii, RS